was a Japanese aviator.

Iinuma was born in Toyoshina (now part of Azumino, Nagano Prefecture), and was a graduate of the Imperial Japanese Army flying school at Tokorozawa.

It became famous on April 9, 1937 as the first Japanese-built aircraft to fly from Japan to Western Europe, making the flight between Tokyo and London, in time for the coronation of King George VI and Queen Elizabeth. The crew consisted of pilot Iinuma and navigator Kenji Tsukagoshi. The flight was the first Fédération Aéronautique Internationale record won by Japanese aviators.

Iinuma later served as chief test pilot for the Kayaba Ka-1 autogyro from May 1941. Iinuma was killed in December 1941 at Phnom Penh airfield in French Indochina when, in a daze from hearing the news of the attack on Pearl Harbor by Japanese forces, he accidentally walked into a spinning aircraft propeller. His death was officially reported as a military casualty.

References

Notes

 Time Magazine. Pilot Iinuma's Lesson. Jan. 12 1942.

Bibliography

 Francillon, René J. Japanese Aircraft of the Pacific War. London: Putnam Aeronautical, 1979. . (new edition 1987. .)
 Yoshimura, Akira Zero Fighter. Greenwood Publishing Group, 1996. ,

External links
Classical Airplanes Ki-15 Kamikaze
New Years cards commemorating the 1937 flight

1912 births
1941 deaths
Aviators killed in aviation accidents or incidents
Japanese aviation record holders
People from Nagano Prefecture
Victims of aviation accidents or incidents in 1941
Japanese military personnel killed in World War II
Imperial Japanese Army personnel of World War II